Neta Alchimister (born April 20, 1994) is an Israeli model, swimwear designer, and social media personality.

Early life
Alchimister was born in Rishon LeZion, Israel, to Israeli-born parents of Ashkenazi Jewish (Austrian-Jewish) descent and of both Sephardi Jewish and Mizrahi Jewish (Libyan-Jewish and Algerian-Jewish) descent. Her father is Eyal Alchimister and her mother is Vardi ( Shalom).

She served as soldier in the Israel Defense Forces in the Teleprocessing Corps.

Modeling and media career
Alchimister was discovered as a model in 2009, while a teenager, at the age of 15. After completing her military service, she co-founded the designer swimwear company BaNaNhot with Israeli model Noa Beny, which today sells limited edition designer swimwear around the world. 

Since 2015, she has been lead model for Castro. She is the founder of designer swimwear company BaNaNhot. 

She is the Israeli with the third most social media followers, after Gal Gadot and Bar Refaeli.

In 2016, she was the cover model for Blazer's swimwear edition.

In 2020, Alchimister was one of the three main judges of Reshet 13's Israeli reality show Comedy Star.

Personal life
In 2014, Alchimister started dating Israeli footballer Rami Gershon. They became engaged in 2018. They married in June 2019.

References

Israeli female models
Israeli Jews
Israeli Ashkenazi Jews
1994 births
Living people
People from Rishon LeZion
Israeli Mizrahi Jews
Sephardi Jews
Israeli people of Austrian-Jewish descent
Israeli people of Algerian-Jewish descent
Israeli people of Libyan-Jewish descent